Monolith of Phobos is the debut studio album by The Claypool Lennon Delirium, consisting of American multi-instrumentalists Sean Lennon and Primus's Les Claypool, released on June 3, 2016.

Reception

The album received generally positive reviews from music critics, receiving a 70 rating on Metacritic. The album also received praise from the general public, sitting at an 8.6 user rating on Metacritic as of August 1, 2017.

Track listing

Personnel
 Les Claypool – vocals, bass, upright bass, Mellotron, drums
 Sean Lennon – vocals, guitar, Mellotron, drums, autoharp, cosmic rain drum

Charts

References

2016 debut albums
Sean Lennon albums
Les Claypool albums
ATO Records albums
Prawn Song Records albums